The  Miss West Virginia USA competition is the pageant that selects the representative for the state of West Virginia in the Miss USA pageant. This pageant is independently conducted and produced by Sanders & Associates, Inc., dba- Pageant Associates based in Buckhannon, West Virginia.

Although West Virginia has not produced a Miss USA, four West Virginian delegates have placed: Kristen Morrison in 2005, Jessi Pierson in 2009, Chelsea Welch in 2013, and Nichole Greene in 2016. Their most recent placement was Krystian Leonard who placed in the Top 16 in 2022.

Four Miss West Virginia USAs have held the Miss West Virginia Teen USA title and competed at Miss Teen USA, and two have competed at Miss America.

Krystian Leonard of Morgantown was crowned Miss West Virginia USA 2022 on June 5, 2022, at Virginia Thomas Law Center for the Performing Arts in West Virginia Wesleyan College in Buckhannon. She represented West Virginia for the title of Miss USA 2022, placed at the top 16.

Gallery of titleholders

Results summary

Placements
1st runners-up: Ruth Parr (1957), Kelly Anderson (1984)
Top 10/11: Paula Morrison (1987), Jessi Pierson (2009), 
Top 15/16: Wilda Estep (1959), Garnett Pugh (1960), Kathy McManaway (1961), Kristin Morrison (2005), Chelsea Welch (2013), Nichole Greene (2016), Krystian Leonard (2022)

West Virginia holds a record of 11 placements at Miss USA.

Awards
Miss Photogenic: Jessi Pierson (2009)

Winners 

Color key

References

External links

West Virginia
Women in West Virginia
Recurring events established in 1952
West Virginia culture
Annual events in West Virginia
1950s establishments in West Virginia